Mount Aorangi is the highest mountain, 3,135 m, in the Millen Range of Victoria Land, Antarctica. The mount was so named by the NZFMCAE, 1962–63, because of this mountain's cloud-piercing ability, and also with reference to Aoraki/Mount Cook, New Zealand, Aorangi or Aoraki meaning cloud piercer. The mountain lies on the Pennell Coast, a portion of Antarctica lying between Cape Williams and Cape Adare.

Aorangi is also one of the most prominent peaks in the Raukumara Range, East Coast, New Zealand.

Mountains of Victoria Land
Pennell Coast